Mojtaba Hosseini (born 5 May 1974 in tehran, Iran) is a retired Iranian football player and current coach. He is currently head coach of  Zob Ahan. He started his playing career with Nassaji Mazandaran in 1988 and played in the team until his retirement in 2004. Six years after his retirement, he began his coaching spell as the assistant coach at Nassaji. After Golmohammadi take overs the reins of Saba in June 2012, he becomes the assistant coach of Saba but resigned from his position in January 2013 to join to the Golmohammadi's technical staff at Persepolis.

Managerial record

References

External links

1973 births
Living people
Iranian footballers
Sportspeople from Tehran
Persepolis F.C. non-playing staff
Persian Gulf Pro League managers
Zob Ahan Esfahan F.C. managers